Pakwach is a town in the Northern Region of Uganda. It is the main commercial, political and administrative center of Pakwach District. In the 19th century the town came under brief occupation by the Ottoman tributary of the Khedivate of Egypt, as part of Hatt-ı Üstuva (Equatoria) Vilayet.

Location
Pakwach is in Pakwach District, West Nile sub-region.

The coordinates of Pakwach are 2°27'43.0"N, 31°29'54.0"E (Latitude:2.461944; Longitude:31.498333).

Population
The 2002 national census estimated the population of the town at 17,625. The Uganda Bureau of Statistics (UBOS) estimated the population of Pakwach at in 21,700, in 2010. In 2011, UBOS estimated the mid-year population of at 22,300. In 2014, the national population census put the population at 23,040.

In 2015, UBOS estimated the population of Pakwach, Uganda at 23,700. In 2020 UBOS estimated the mid-year population of the town at 28,700 inhabitants, of whom 14,900 (51.9 percent) were females and 13,800 (48.1 percent) were males. UBOS calculated that the population of this town increased at an average annual rate of 3.6 percent, between 2015 and 2020.

2013 total solar eclipse
On 3 November 2013, Pakwach was the centre of Uganda's solar eclipse celebrations. Thousands of locals were joined by solar eclipse tourists and professional observers. The official celebration, which took place at a primary school 10 kilometers from the town of Pakwach, was attended by three kings (Rwothi), Uganda's President Museveni, and cabinet ministers.

Points of interest
The following additional points of interest lies within the town limits or near its edges: (a) the offices of Pakwach Town Council (b) the offices of Pakwach District local government (c) Pakwach central market (d) the northwestern corner of Murchison Falls National Park, a few kilometers east of Pakwach (e) the Karuma–Olwiyo–Pakwach–Nebbi–Arua Road passes through the middle of town in a general east to west direction and the proposed Pakwach Campus of Muni University, housing the Faculty of Fisheries and Aquaculture Uganda Christian University, with its man campus in Mukono, maintains a campus in Pakwach.

See also 
 Rift Valley Railways
 Transport in Uganda 
 List of cities and towns in Uganda

References

External links
 Pakwach gets new administrative units As of 1 May 2018.

Populated places in Northern Region, Uganda
Lake Albert (Africa)
Populated places on the Nile
Pakwach District
West Nile sub-region